Temptation Island is a 2011 Philippine comedy drama film directed by Chris Martinez and starring Marian Rivera, Rufa Mae Quinto, Heart Evangelista, Lovi Poe, and Solenn Heussaff. The film co-stars John Lapus, Tom Rodriguez, Aljur Abrenica, and Mikael Daez. the film was produced by Regal Films and GMA Pictures.

The film is a direct remake of the 1980 film of the same name directed by Joey Gosiengfiao. Using the same plot, dialogue, and character names with the exception of the five girls. The names of the girls are based on Gosengfiao’s other works; Virginia P, Nympha, Diary of Cristina Gaston, Secrets of Pura, and Nights of Serafina. A side-by-side comparison is shown in the credits.

Plot 

When the Miss Manila Sunshine Supermodel search starts. It attracts the attention of the socialite Serafina L. (Lovi Poe) with her assistant, Nympha (Rufa Mae Quinto), a try-hard elite, Pura K. (Solenn Heussaff) who was planning her birthday, Virginia P. (Heart Evangelista), a wealthy college student who wanted independency, and Cristina G (Marian Rivera) who plans to seduce one of the judges in order to win. The four finalists have been chosen and the Miss body beautiful title goes to Virginia, Miss Photogenic goes to Pura, Serafina receives the Miss Friendship title and Miss Talent goes to Cristina. The four must stay in an island for one month for the final judging. On their way with a yacht, Pageant Director, Joshua (John Lapuz) proposes to his photographer boyfriend Ricardo (Mikael Daez) but he rejects for now. Alfred, (Aljur Abrenica) Virginia’s admirer who snuck in the yacht is caught by the waiter named Umberto (Tom Rodriguez). Serafina brought her assistant Nympha who she verbally abuses often while Cristina is with her boyfriend, Antonio (Dennis Trillo) who is self-described as a crook. Serafina and Pura show distaste with each other. A fire has started when Umberto leaves his lit cigarette to chase Alfred. The fire caused an explosion and eventually sinking of the yacht.

While the remaining passengers are alive and well, the four finalists along with Nympha, Umberto, Joshua, Ricardo, and Alfred found themselves in a desert island with no sort of locals or community in sight. Their cellphones cannot find a signal as well. Serafina stays positive while Cristina remains frustrated, Nympha and Pura are both terrified. The group tries catching fishes with panty hoses but only catches small scale fishes, not enough for the group. Virginia and Alfred start getting closer with each other, Umberto shows interest with Cristina and Ricardo gets closer with Pura much to Joshua’s infuriation. Serafina starts questioning since no guy showed interest in her. Throughout the days, small huts were made using the parts of the finalist’s gowns. The five girls start hallucinating; seeing human-size chicken, ice cream and even started eating sand in a montage. One night, when Virginia turns down Alfred, Serafina seduces him and had sex while Cristina shares intimacy with Umberto and Pura is with Ricardo. Joshua who witnesses the night, goes missing.

The next day, Serafina reveals he slept with Alfred which started a fight with the rest of the girls and she is defeated by Cristina. Cristina, in frustration runs out and chased by Umberto. They stumble upon Joshua’s dead body. They found out that he committed suicide, as the group mourns over Joshua and proposes burying the body. Pura suggests eating one of Joshua’s body part to fulfill their hunger. The group are disgusted but had no choice. Nympha finally stands up for herself when Serafina insults her and her whole family but makes up when Serafina promises payment when they get home. Umberto serves Joshua’s cooked body part. The group cries as they eat the food, they sing “Habang may Buhay,” a song famously played in funerals. At the end of the song, they notice a group of helicopter and chases it, but it fails to spot them. Out of frustration, each of the finalist promises to change once they leave the island, they also make up with each other. A group of soldiers arrive to rescue them. Once they are back in Manila, the pageant goes on and Serafina wins the Miss Sunshine Manila, she thanks her family, her newly found friends, Nympha, and Joshua. After the competition, Pura and Ricardo reveal their plans for marriage, Serafina decided to bring Nympha in California, Virginia makes up with Alfred, and Cristina chooses Umberto over Antonio.

Cast

Main cast
 Marian Rivera as Cristina G.
 Rufa Mae Quinto as Nympha
 Heart Evangelista as Virginia P.
 Lovi Poe as Serafina L.
 Solenn Heussaff as Pura K.

Supporting cast
 John Lapus as Joshua
 Tom Rodriguez as Umberto
 Mikael Daez as Ricardo
 Aljur Abrenica as Alfred
 Dennis Trillo as Antonio
 Maggie Wilson as herself
 Deborah Sun as Nenuca Kikinang
 Tim Yap as himself
 Tessa Prieto-Valdes as herself
 Mang Enriquez as Host

Production
In 2010, Regal Films decided to remake their 80s cult hit film Temptation Island that starred Dina Bonnevie, Deborah Sun, Jennifer Cortez, Bambi Arambulo, and Azenith Briones. Initially, ABS-CBN had the TV rights from Regal Films to remake the film into a TV series together with another 80s film, Underage. But Regal Films asked to take back the rights and the two companies compromised that ABS-CBN artists would be part of the remake. The initial cast were supposedly Marian Rivera, Angelica Panganiban, Lovi Poe, Pokwang, Carla Abellana, Shaina Magdayao, and Andi Eigenmann. But, Regal Films decided to co-produce the film with GMA Films, which is ABS-CBN's rival network's film studio Star Cinema, and they then pulled out ABS-CBN artists of the film. In March 2011, the final cast was revealed and that the film will star Marian Rivera, Heart Evangelista, Solenn Heussaff, and Lovi Poe. The leading men completed the cast with Aljur Abrenica, Tom Rodriguez, and Mikael Daez. Paulo Avelino was initially one of the leading men, but later refused because of health reasons. He was replaced by Mikael Daez.

In April 2011, production started in Paoay, Ilocos Norte.

Reception 

See also 
 Temptation Island (1980 film)

References

External links
 

Regal Entertainment films
GMA Pictures films
2010s Tagalog-language films
2011 films
2011 comedy-drama films
Films shot in Ilocos Norte
Remakes of Philippine films
Philippine comedy-drama films
2010s English-language films
Films directed by Chris Martinez